Elizabeth Kuti (born 1969) is an English actress and playwright.

Life

English-born Kuti graduated from Balliol College, Oxford with a degree in English, and completed her MA at King's College London. She is of partial Hungarian descent through her paternal grandfather, whose original surname Kipslinger was adapted to 'Kuti' to disguise its Germanic origins.
In 1993 she moved to Ireland to study at Trinity College Dublin, where she wrote her doctoral thesis on eighteenth-century women playwrights. In October 2004, she joined the Department of Literature, Film, and Theatre Studies, University of Essex.

In 1999, the company Rough Magic produced her first work for the theatre, the completion of Frances Sheridan's eighteenth-century comedy A Trip to Bath, retitled as The Whisperers.

She has performed with most of Ireland's leading theatre companies including the Abbey and Peacock, Rough Magic, Loose Canon, Bedrock and the Corn Exchange.

She performed in Car Show; Dublin 1742, by John Banville; Melonfarmer, by Alex Johnston; Still, by Rosalind Haslett. She directed Stone Ghosts, by Sue Mythen.

Awards
She won the 2006 Susan Smith Blackburn Prize.

Works
 The Lais of Marie de France, (Andrews Lane Studio, Dublin Fringe Festival, 1995).
 The Whisperers (A Trip To Bath), (1999)
 The Countrywoman, (2000)
 Treehouses, (2000)
 
 The Six-Days World, (2007)
 Eighty Miles
 Funerals in My Brain, (workshop production at the Man in the Moon Theatre, London),
 Teen Lurve, (comedy-drama series for BBC Radio 5)
 Time Spent On Trains
 Fishskin Trousers Nick Hern Books 2013  (Premier at The Finborough Theatre, London, September 2013 )

Reviews
Kuti is indeed a fine writer, and this is a text that repays re-reading. The sugar metaphor - the sweetness that is of often sour, not just to the slaves forced to produce it but to everyone who thereafter touches it - is particularly powerful.

References

 Krisztina Kodó: Multicultural Identities in Elizabeth Kuti's Dramatic Writing  http://www.freesideeurope.com/articles/multicultural-identities-in-elizabeth-kuti-s-dramatic-writing-71

External links
Elizabeth Kuti, doollee

1969 births
Living people
Alumni of Balliol College, Oxford
Alumni of King's College London
Alumni of Trinity College Dublin
Academics of the University of Essex
British people of Hungarian descent